Hashim Abderrahman al-Shibli is an Iraqi politician from Baghdad who was the Iraqi Justice Minister from 2006 to 2007 in the government of Nouri al-Maliki. A Sunni Arab, he was elected to the National Assembly of Iraq in December 2005 on the secular Iraqi National List coalition.

In 2005 he was nominated to the post of Human Rights Minister in the Iraqi Transitional Government which he turned down, saying he wasn't consulted before being nominated. Prior to that he had been the Minister of Justice in the Iraqi Governing Council. A lawyer and Sunni Muslim, al-Shibli is a member of the newly formed National Democratic Party (Iraq).

Shibli is also the chairman of the government committee charged with implementing the articles of the Constitution of Iraq that relate to Kirkuk's status.

Following the leaking of a videotape of Saddam Hussein's execution, with the detention on January 3, 2007 of a guard under al-Shibli's ministry, suspicions have arisen that his ministry may have intended to inflame sectarian tensions.

He resigned from his post at March 31, 2007, citing political differences with the Prime Minister al-Maliki over the execution of Saddam Hussein and with the Iraqi National List over the future of Kirkuk. However a spokesman for the government said his inability to control abuse at prisons meant he was going to be replaced in a forthcoming reshuffle.

References
 
 

|-

Government ministers of Iraq
Living people
Year of birth missing (living people)
People from Baghdad
National Democratic Party (Iraq) politicians
Justice ministers of Iraq